Homerus is the Greek poet Homer, the author of the Iliad and the Odyssey.

Homerus may also refer to:
Homerus of Byzantium, 3rd century Ancient Greek grammarian and tragic poet
5700 Homerus, an asteroid
MS Trelleborg (1958), a ship that was later renamed Homerus
Papilio homerus, the Homerus swallowtail butterfly of Jamaica